Adrián Villagómez García (2 January 1952 – 6 February 2013) was a Mexican politician affiliated with the Institutional Revolutionary Party. He served as Deputy of the LIX Legislature of the Mexican Congress representing Nuevo León.

References

1952 births
2013 deaths
Politicians from Monterrey
Institutional Revolutionary Party politicians
Members of the Chamber of Deputies (Mexico) for Nuevo León